Spanish Town (Spanish: Ciudad Española) may refer to one of the following:

 Spanish Town, the former Spanish and English capital of Jamaica
 Spanish Town, Baton Rouge, Louisiana, United States
 Spanish Town, British Virgin Islands, the main settlement on Virgin Gorda island
 Spanish Town, U.S. Virgin Islands

See also
Spanish City